Statistics of Primeira Liga in the 1943–44 season.

Overview

It was contested by 10 teams, and Sporting Clube de Portugal won the championship.

League standings

Results

References

Primeira Liga seasons
1943–44 in Portuguese football
Portugal